Ronda, officially the Municipality of Ronda,  is a 5th class municipality in the province of Cebu, Philippines. According to the 2020 census, it has a population of 21,005 people.

Ronda is bordered to the north by the town of Dumanjug, to the west is the Tañon Strait, to the east is the town of Argao, and to the south is the town of Alcantara.

Etymology

Ronda (which is named after a a town in Malaga) is usually attributed to the Spanish word ”ronda” which means ”to round” or ”to patrol” but evidence suggests Ronda is derived from Arunda, presumably of Celtic origin however its meaning is uncertain. 

Oral traditions suggest that the town was named “Holoyaw” before the Spanish conquest. ‘’Holoyaw’’ refers to a type of banana that was abundant in the area. Others posit the name’s origin to Jolo as the southern parts of the Visayas was infamous to being vulnerable to raids by Muslim pirates. However, Jolo is just a recent orthographic innovation from earlier “Xoló”, with the “x” being pronounced as /ʃ/ (the sh in English ship).

Geography

Barangays
Ronda comprises 14 barangays:

Climate

Demographics

Economy

References

External links
 [ Philippine Standard Geographic Code]

Municipalities of Cebu